Mount McNeil is a rhyolite lava dome, located 41 km west of Carcross and 7 km south of Mount Skukum, Yukon Territory, Canada. It was formed during the Cenozoic eruptions of the  Skukum Group.

See also
List of volcanoes in Canada
Volcanism in Canada

References
 Mount McNeil in the Canadian Mountain Encyclopedia

McNeil, Mount
McNeil, Mount
McNeil